Holland House is a 17th-century great house in Kensington, London.

Holland House may also refer to:

Houses and other structures

United Kingdom 

 Little Holland House, the dower house of Holland House, where a salon was held
 Holland House, Cardiff, now a hotel operated by Mercure Hotels
 Holland House, a retreat and meeting venue in Cropthorne, Wiltshire
 Holland House, Kingsgate, country house in Kent, built by the first Baron Holland
 Holland House School, an independent preparatory school in Edgware, London

United States 

Thomas Holland House, Hillsboro, Alabama, listed on the National Register of Historic Places (NRHP) in Lawrence County, Alabama
Holland House (Denver, Colorado), a Denver Landmark
Benjamin Franklin Holland House, Bartow, Florida, NRHP-listed
Holland House (Atlanta), Atlanta, Georgia – built in 1842 it was the oldest house in Atlanta still standing in the early 1900s
Teasley–Holland House, Hartwell, Georgia, listed on the NRHP in Hart County
Dr. Madison Monroe Holland House, Statesboro, Georgia, NRHP-listed in Bulloch County
Ora Holland House, Dubuque, Iowa, NRHP-listed in Dubuque County
Holland–Drew House, Lewiston, Maine, NRHP-listed
Captain Holland House, Lewiston, Maine, NRHP-listed
Holland–Towne House, Petersham, Massachusetts, NRHP-listed
Ward–Holland House, Marine City, Michigan, NRHP-listed in St. Clair County
McPherson–Holland House, Glendale, Missouri, listed on the NRHP in St. Louis County
10 Rockefeller Plaza, New York, New York, formerly referred to as "Holland House"
Holland House (New York City)
Holland–Summers House, Harmony, North Carolina, NRHP-listed in Iredell County
Tull–Worth–Holland Farm, Kinston, North Carolina, NRHP-listed in Lenoir County
Russ and Holland Snow Houses, Brecksville, Ohio, listed on the NRHP in Cuyahoga County
George Holland House, Gettysburg, South Dakota, listed on the NRHP in Potter County
William Holland Jr. House, Jackson, Tennessee, listed on the NRHP in Madison County
Holland–Smith–Brown House, Centerville, Utah, listed on the NRHP in Davis County
Burwell–Holland House, Glade Hill, Virginia, NRHP-listed in Franklin County
Holland–Duncan House, Moneta, Virginia, NRHP-listed in Franklin County
Holland House (Buffalo, Wyoming), listed on the NRHP in Johnson County

Consumer brands 

 Holland House, a brand of cooking wines and vinegars belonging to Mizkan
 Holland House, a furniture-making subsidiary of H. T. Hackney Company

See also
Holland Hall (disambiguation)

Architectural disambiguation pages